For the 1994 FIFA World Cup qualification, there were two inter-confederation play-offs to determine the final qualification spot to the 1994 FIFA World Cup. The matches were played between 31 July – 17 November 1993.

Format
The three teams from the three confederations (CONCACAF, CONMEBOL, and OFC) were drawn into two ties. The CONCACAF and OFC teams faced each other first, with the winner advancing to play the CONMEBOL team.

The play-offs were played over two legs, with each team playing one leg at home. The team that scored more goals on aggregate over the two legs advanced. If the aggregate score was level, the away goals rule is applied, i.e. the team that scored more goals away from home over the two legs advanced. If away goals were also equal, then thirty minutes of extra time was played. The away goals rule was again applied after extra time, i.e. if there are goals scored during extra time and the aggregate score is still level, the visiting team advances by virtue of more away goals scored. If no goals are scored during extra time, the tie was decided by penalty shoot-out.

Qualified teams

Bracket

Matches
The matches were played between 31 July – 17 November 1993.

First round: CONCACAF v OFC

3–3 on aggregate. Australia won 4–1 on penalties and advanced to the play-off against the CONMEBOL team.

Second round: OFC v CONMEBOL

Argentina won 2–1 on aggregate and qualified for the 1994 FIFA World Cup.

Goalscorers
There were 9 goals scored in 4 matches, for an average of 2.25 goals per match.

1 goal

 Abel Balbo
 Mehmet Durakovic
 Frank Farina
 Aurelio Vidmar
 Lyndon Hooper
 Domenic Mobilio
 Mark Watson

2 own goals

 Alex Tobin
 Nick Dasovic

References

Play-off